The municipalities represent the local level of administration in Finland and act as the fundamental, self-governing administrative units of the country. The entire country is incorporated into municipalities and legally, all municipalities are equal, although certain municipalities are called cities or towns. Municipalities have the right to levy a flat percentual income tax, which is between 16 and 22 percent, and they provide two thirds of public services. Municipalities control many community services, such as schools, health care and the water supply, and local streets. They do not maintain highways, set laws or keep police forces, which are responsibilities of the central government.

Government
Municipalities have council-manager government: they are governed by an elected council, which is legally autonomous and answers only to the voters. The size of the council is proportional to the population, the extremes being 9 in Sottunga and 85 in Helsinki. A subsection of the council, the municipal executive board (kunnanhallitus), controls the municipal government and monitors the implementation of decisions of the council. Its decisions must be approved by the council. Unlike national cabinets, its composition is derived from the composition of the council, not along government-opposition lines. Furthermore, individual decisions are prepared in specialized municipal boards (lautakunta) for a council meeting, which include, for example, zoning, social assistance, and education boards. Council, executive board, and municipal board memberships are elected positions of responsibility, not full-time jobs. Remuneration depends on the municipality and position, but is generally nominal or modest: a regular council member is paid 70 euro on average on a per-meeting basis (2017).

Municipal managers (for cities,  for other municipalities) are civil servants named by the council. The city manager of Helsinki is called  /  "Lord Mayor" for historical reasons. There were previously no mayors in Finland, but after a change in law, Tampere was first city to elect a mayor ( / ) in 2007. The mayor is not, however, currently elected directly, but by the municipal council. The mayor acts as municipal manager and as a speaker of municipal council.

Although municipalities do not have police or legislative powers, local ordinances concerning traffic can be set, and municipal parking inspectors can give parking tickets. Municipalities are legal persons and can appear in an administrative court. Likewise, the state of Finland is a separate legal person.

Excluding judicial review of formal compliance to administrative law, municipalities are independent and not a part of a local state hierarchy. Municipalities cooperate in regions of Finland. State agencies have jurisdictions spanning one or more regions: each region is served by an ely-keskus (elinkeino-, liikenne- ja ympäristökeskus) on matters of employment, the economy, transport and environment, while law and environmental enforcement is handled by the local aluehallintovirasto, governing multi-region jurisdictions termed alue.-G.H-

Taxation and revenue

Residents pay a municipal tax that is a form of income tax, which is the mainstay of the income of a municipality (42% of income). Municipal tax is nominally a flat tax that is levied from a broader population (including lower income levels) than progressive state income tax, which is collected only from medium to high income earners. However, in practice even the municipal tax is progressive due to generous deductions granted to the lowest income levels. The pre-deduction base tax varies from 16% in affluent Kauniainen to 20% or more in a number of small rural municipalities. Next to the municipal tax, municipalities receive funding from the state budget (19% of income). This funding is means-tested to municipality wealth and serves to balance the differences in municipal tax revenue. Besides taxes, sales revenue, fees and profit of operations also form a substantial share of municipal income (21%). In 2023, taxation will be significantly changed, when new wellbeing services counties are founded. Since these are funded by the state, municipal taxes will be reduced by 12.64 percentage points from ~20 to ~7%, and state taxes will be increased correspondingly.

Additionally, municipalities levy a property tax, amounting to 3.6% of income, which is comparatively low: the annual fee is 0.32-0.75% of net present value for permanent residences and 0.50-1.00% for leisure properties like summer cottages as well as undeveloped plots. This is always paid by the owner, never a tenant directly, unlike the council tax. Municipalities receive a share of corporate tax revenue from companies having a place of business in the municipality (3.8% of income).

Some municipal functions receive direct funding both from the municipality and the state, e.g. AMK vocational colleges.

Tasks and services 

Finland has an extensive welfare state, and municipalities are responsible for much of the services to that end. Tasks of the municipalities are as follows:

 Social services
 Children's daycare
 Elderly care
 Disabled care
 Social welfare service
 Child protection
 Education (see Education in Finland) and culture
 Peruskoulu (primary education, grades 1–9)
 Lukio (gymnasiums)
 Ammattioppilaitos (secondary vocational schools)
 Ammattikorkeakoulu (tertiary vocational schools)
 Kansanopisto (folk high school)
 Public libraries
 Youth centres
 Public exercise facilities (public tracks, etc.)
 Infrastructure and land use
 Zoning
Public transport
 Maintenance of local streets
 Water
 Energy
 Waste collection
 Environment
 Economic development
 Promotion of the local economy and employment
 Law enforcement
 Food safety inspection
 Animal welfare inspection
 Environmental protection inspection
 Parking enforcement
 Public transport payment enforcement

Although municipalities are responsible for their own finances, there is much highly specific legislation and regulation that requires the services to be provided up to a standard. Thus, although municipalities have the power to voluntarily spend tax-generated income, they are required to first allocate funds to legally prescribed services.

Municipalities may provide some of these services through corporations that they own or from private companies that they regulate. For example, 
Helsinki Regional Transport Authority (HSL) provides public transport services in the capital area.

From 2023, new wellbeing services counties will take the responsibility for healthcare and social services from the municipalities.

Statistics

, there are 310 municipalities in Finland, of which 107 are cities or towns (kaupunki). Sixteen municipalities are unilingually Swedish (all in the autonomous Åland region), while 33 are bilingual: 15 with Swedish as the majority language (all but four in Ostrobothnia) and 18 with Finnish as the majority language (all but five in Uusimaa region). Four municipalities in northern Lapland (Utsjoki, Inari, Sodankylä and Enontekiö) have one or all of the three Sami languages spoken in Finland as an official language.

Finnish municipalities can choose to be called either kaupunki (city or town) or kunta (small town or rural municipality). Although the Finnish Environment Institute classifies urban settlements with over 15,000 inhabitants as kaupunki, municipalities can name themselves kaupunki with fewer inhabitants. There are  inhabitants in Nurmijärvi, the largest kunta in Finland, and  inhabitants in Kaskinen, the smallest kaupunki, so the kunta–kaupunki categorisation mainly concerns the name of the municipality.

The areas of the municipalities vary, as the population is the primary criterion for forming a municipality. The smallest municipalities are very small towns. Kaskinen is an independent town with a land area of only . Kauniainen, which was originally a corporation in Espoo, is only .

History
Municipalities were originally parishes. Municipalities were divided into villages, which consisted of individual properties. Borders between properties and thus municipalities were defined by oral agreements passed down from generation to generation; usually along straight lines between defined markers such as boulders. Medieval documentation survives only from legal disputes concerning borders. In the 18th century, King Gustaf III implemented the Great Partition, where common lands were redistributed into larger properties, and claimed all unclaimed land to the crown. Thus, there is no "leftover" land outside the jurisdiction of municipalities, as all land belongs to either to a private property or to the government. The secular government divided the properties to taxable units (villages and secular municipalities) according to its own convenience, which were not necessarily convergent with parishes. Furthermore, cities were chartered separately. Up to 1734, the law was different in cities than in rural municipalities.

In 1865, the modern municipalities were established as secular entities separate from the parishes. The reform was inspired by the Swedish municipal reforms of 1862. Up to 1964, cities financed their own police and registry services. Until 1977 municipalities were divided into cities, market towns and rural municipalities. The market town category was abolished and these were renamed as cities. The rest of the municipalities were classified as 'other municipalities'. All municipalities called maalaiskunta were eventually either merged to their parent cities or changed their names. From 1995 onwards only 'municipality' is recognized by law and any municipality is allowed to call itself a city.

Identification and heraldry

Not all municipalities have an obvious urban center; indeed, rural municipalities are often composed of distributed rural villages. Although the church village (kirkonkylä, abbreviated kk) is the historical center, the largest or administrative center may be in another village. For example, Askola has a church village (Askolan kirkonkylä), but its administrative center is in Monninkylä. Often, the church village has the same name as the municipality, as with Askola. However, this is not necessarily so, e.g. Enontekiö is governed from Hetta; these villages are often erroneously labeled in maps. This is expected as the name of the municipality refers to the entire parish, not just a single center like a church village. Villages have no administrative role, although some have voluntary village associations (kyläyhdistys) and other non-governmental public life.

Although related, urban areas in Finland (taajama) are not local administrative units. A catalog is independently compiled each year by Statistics Finland, a state agency, and used primarily for traffic-related purposes (signage, speed limits, and highway planning). There are 745 officially recognized urban areas in Finland, 49 of which have more than 10,000 inhabitants and six more than 100,000.

Each municipality has a distinct coat of arms. They are posted on the municipal borders and shown in official documents representing the municipality. The coats of arms for many municipalities have been designed in the modern era, many of them by Gustaf von Numers. In addition, municipalities like Vantaa since 2015 and Helsinki since 2017 have a logo distinct from their coat of arms.

Capital region
Distinctively, the capital area, or Greater Helsinki, has no special arrangements. The area consists of four entirely independent cities that form a continuous conurbation. Greater Helsinki has grown in population and area relatively quickly: the nearby municipalities, considered rural only 50 years ago, have become suburbs, and the growth is projected to continue. A state-imposed merger of Helsinki and a part of Sipoo, a rural, 40% Swedish-speaking municipality adjacent to Greater Helsinki, was approved by the government in 2006, counter to the opinion of the Sipoo municipal council. This area will effectively become a new (and Finnish-speaking) suburb with multiple times the inhabitants than there are in Sipoo.

Mergers and reform
There is currently a heated political debate in Finland about reforming the municipality system. Essentially, a multitude of small municipalities is seen as detrimental to the provision of public services, having originated during Finland's agrarian years. As a result, there have been suggestions of state-imposed mergers. A committee led by the former Minister for Regional and Municipal Affairs,  Hannes Manninen, suggested creating a two-tier system of municipalities with different powers, while the Association of Finnish Local and Regional Authorities favoured a system where municipalities would be units of at least 20,000–30,000 inhabitants, cf. the current median at 4,700. The motion was inspired by a similar reform in Denmark (see Municipalities of Denmark). The former government (Vanhanen II), however, planned to not impose mergers.

Recently, many voluntary mergers have been agreed on. Ten mergers were completed in 2005, one in 2006, 14 in 2007 and one in 2008. In 2009, there were even more, many of which consolidated more than two municipalities. Several cities merged with surrounding rural municipalities in Hämeenlinna, Salo, Kouvola, Seinäjoki, Naantali, Kauhava, Lohja, Raseborg, Jyväskylä and Oulu in 2009. In total, there were 32 mergers, involving 99 municipalities, that reduced the number of municipalities by 67. The year 2009 also marked the end of the last maalaiskunta, a municipality surrounding a city but sharing the name, in Jyväskylä. There were four mergers in 2010, six in 2011, ten in 2013, three in 2015, four in 2016, two in 2017, one in 2020 and one in 2021. In the period 2005–2021, the number of municipalities was voluntarily reduced from 444 to 309.

In 2012, Katainen's government published an extensive plan aiming at merging municipalities to reach a target of population 20,000 per municipality. Commuter belts have also been proposed as a target by a government committee, such that municipalities where more than 35% of workforce commutes would be subject to a merger.

The Sipilä cabinet, from 2015, had been preparing a significant reform of health and social services (sote-uudistus), aimed at increasing choice between municipal and private healthcare, and assigning some healthcare responsibilities into larger units than a municipality. This was finished by the Marin cabinet.

Municipalities by regions 
Municipalities of Central Finland
Municipalities of Finland Proper
Municipalities of Kainuu
Municipalities of Kymenlaakso
Municipalities of Lapland
Municipalities of North Karelia
Municipalities of South Karelia
Municipalities of Ostrobothnia
Municipalities of Central Ostrobothnia
Municipalities of Northern Ostrobothnia
Municipalities of Southern Ostrobothnia
Municipalities of Pirkanmaa
Municipalities of Satakunta
Municipalities of Northern Savonia
Municipalities of Southern Savonia
Municipalities of Tavastia Proper
Municipalities of Päijänne Tavastia
Municipalities of Uusimaa
Municipalities of Åland

Map

See also 
List of Finnish municipalities
List of cities and towns in Finland
List of former municipalities of Finland

References

External links 
 

 
Finland, Municipalities of
Subdivisions of Finland
Municipalities
Finland 3
Municipalities, Finland
Lists of populated places in Finland
Finland